Jo Woo-ri (born March 29, 1992) is a South Korean actress. She starred in television series such as Medical Top Team (2013), Modern Farmer (2014), A Daughter Just Like You (2015), Descendants of the Sun (2016)  and Gangnam Beauty (2018).

Filmography

Television series

Web series

Awards and nominations

References

External links

 

1992 births
Living people
South Korean television actresses
South Korean web series actresses
Chung-Ang University alumni
Pungyang Jo clan